Marcelo D'Salete (born 1979) is a Brazilian comic book writer, illustrator and professor. He holds a master's degree in art history from the University of São Paulo.

During his adolescence, he studied graphic design at Carlos de Campos College and worked as an illustrator for publishers. He premiered as a comic book artist in 2001, publishing in the magazines Quadreca and Front.

His first graphic novel, Noite Luz, was published in 2008. In 2011, he published the comic book Encruzilhada.

His most acclaimed works deal with the history of resistance to slavery in Brazil from the perspective of the Afro-Brazilian peoples: Cumbe, from 2014, and Angola Janga from 2017. Angola Janga, a story about the  Palmares quilombo, took eleven years of research and work by the author. D'Salete was nominated for the HQ Mix Trophy in 2012 and 2015. Cumbe was published in English in 2017 by Fantagraphics as Run for It: Stories of Slaves Who Fought for Their Freedom. It was nominated for and won the 2018 Eisner Awards, in the Best U.S. Edition of International Material category.

References

External links 

 Official website  (in Portuguese)
  
 
 Marcelo D'Salete  on Lambiek

Living people
1979 births
Brazilian comics writers
Brazilian comics artists
Brazilian illustrators
Brazilian people of African descent
People from São Paulo
University of São Paulo alumni